Austria-Hungary national bandy team made an appearance at the 1913 European Bandy Championships, which were played in Davos, Switzerland. Some years later, Austria-Hungary dissolved due to the outcome of the First World War.

References

Austria-Hungary
Sport in Austria-Hungary
Bandy in Hungary